is the debut single by Japanese rock act Superfly, released on April 4, 2007. The tune was composed by guitarist Koichi Tabo with lyrics co-written by vocalist Shiho Ochi. The song begins . It reached 31st place on the Oricon weekly singles chart and charted for seven weeks. When sold through the iTunes Store, a special "Bonus Version" of the single was released featuring a live version of "Hello Hello" subtitled "13,000 Person Live @ Osaka-jō Hall FM802 Requestage".

Track listing

References

2007 singles
2007 songs
Japanese-language songs
Superfly (band) songs
Warner Music Japan singles